General Sir Charles Hastings, 1st Baronet, GCH (12 March 1752 – September 1823) was a British Army officer.

Family
Hastings was the illegitimate son of Francis Hastings, 10th Earl of Huntingdon, and an unknown mother who was in fact a famous French courtesan, la demoiselle Lany, "danseuse de l'Opéra". He was born in Paris on 12 March 1752 and brought up in England.

He married Parnel Abney, the only daughter and heiress of Thomas Abney of Willesley Hall in Willesley, Derbyshire. Thomas Abney was the son of Sir Thomas Abney, Justice of the Common Pleas.

Hastings had two sons, Charles, born on 1 October 1792, and Frank, who was born on 6 February 1794, and a daughter, Selina, who died young.

He was created a baronet, of Willesley Hall in the County of Derby, on 18 February 1806. He was also a Knight Grand Cross of the Royal Guelphic Order. Hastings had an ancestral seat at Willesley from his marriage and a house in Harley Street in Middlesex.

Lady Hastings passed her life in seclusion and near blindness at their ancestral home.

Hastings took his own life and had acorns buried with him in 1823. He was succeeded by his son, Charles, who changed his name to Abney-Hastings. His son Frank Abney Hastings fought at the Battle of Trafalgar and died at Zante.

Military career
He purchased an ensigncy in the 12th Foot, in 1776 a Lieutenancy, and in 1780 a captaincy. In 1783, he purchased a majority in the 76th Foot, but by 1786 was a lieutenant-colonel on half-pay of the 72nd Foot. In 1786, he became Lieutenant-Colonel of the 34th Foot. In 1789, he retired on half-pay again, and during this time transferred to the 65th Foot. In 1798, he transferred to the 61st Foot as lieutenant-colonel and soon afterwards was promoted brevet colonel and major-general on the same day. In 1800, he became lieutenant-colonel of the 65th Foot. In 1806, he was promoted colonel of the 4th Foot, then transferred to the 77th Foot, and in 1811 returned to his old regiment, the 12th Foot. He was later promoted general.

References

|-

|-

1752 births
1823 deaths
Baronets in the Baronetage of the United Kingdom
British Army generals
British Army personnel of the Napoleonic Wars
Suffolk Regiment officers
76th Regiment of Foot officers
72nd Highlanders officers
34th Regiment of Foot officers
65th Regiment of Foot officers
King's Own Royal Regiment officers
77th Regiment of Foot officers
British military personnel who committed suicide
Suicides in England
61st Regiment of Foot officers
Place of birth missing
Place of death missing
Charles Hastings, 1st Baronet